Bárbara Constanza Santibáñez Flores (born 3 March 1996) is a Chilean footballer who plays as a forward for Spanish Segunda División Pro club CFF Cáceres and the Chile women's national team.

International career
Santibáñez represented Chile at the 2010 FIFA U-17 Women's World Cup.

Honours

Club
Colo-Colo
Chilean women's football championship (4): 2010, 2011 Apertura, 2011 Clausura, 2012 Apertura

Palestino
Chilean women's football championship (1), 2015 Clausura

References

External links

1996 births
Living people
Women's association football forwards
Chilean women's footballers
Footballers from Santiago
Chile women's international footballers
Colo-Colo (women) footballers
Everton de Viña del Mar footballers
Santiago Morning (women) footballers
Club Deportivo Palestino footballers
Universidad de Chile footballers
Primera División (women) players
Sporting de Huelva players
Zaragoza CFF players
Segunda Federación (women) players
Granada CF footballers
Chilean expatriate women's footballers
Chilean expatriate sportspeople in Spain
Expatriate women's footballers in Spain
CP Cacereño (women) players
Primera Federación (women) players